The 1985 Five Nations Championship was the fifty-sixth series of the rugby union Five Nations Championship. Including the previous incarnations as the Home Nations and Five Nations, this was the ninety-first series of the northern hemisphere rugby union championship.  Ten matches were played between 2 February and 20 April.  The championship was contested by England, France, Ireland, Scotland and Wales.

The championship winner was Ireland, winning their tenth title (excluding eight other shared titles); it would prove to be their last in 24 years, until their Grand Slam in 2009. Ireland also claimed the Triple Crown, their sixth, which would be their last until 2004.

The tournament suffered three match postponements due to bad weather. The opening fixtures, Ireland v England and France v Wales, were postponed to late March and the Wales v England match was put back from February to April because of a frozen pitch in Cardiff. The rescheduled match was notable for the debut, at fly half for Wales, of Jonathan Davies.

Participants
The teams involved were:

Table

Squads

Results

References

1985 Five Nations results

External links

The official RBS Six Nations Site
1985 Five Nations Championship at ESPN

Six Nations Championship seasons
Five Nations
Five Nations
Five Nations
Five Nations
Five Nations
Five Nations
 
Five Nations
Five Nations
Five Nations